William Eddy is an American author. Currently the John C. Warner Professor of Statistics, Emeritus at Carnegie Mellon University and is an Elected Fellow of the American Association for the Advancement of Science, American Statistical Association and Institute of Mathematical Statistics.

Eddy received a A.B. degree in statistics from Princeton University, followed by M.A., M.Phil., and Ph.D. degrees in statistics from Yale University. He began teaching at Carnegie Mellon University in 1976.

References

Year of birth missing (living people)
Living people
Carnegie Mellon University faculty
Princeton University alumni
Yale Graduate School of Arts and Sciences alumni
American statisticians